This is a list of various national and international dental organizations from around the world.

Australia
 Australian Dental Association Inc.

Canada

 Canadian Association of Orthodontists
 Canadian Dental Association
 Royal College of Dentists

Europe
 European Federation of Periodontology
 International Association of Paediatric Dentistry

India
Indian Dental Association
Dental Council of India

Seychelles
 Seychelles Medical and Dental Association
Seychelles Medical and Dental Council

Sweden 
 Swedish Dental Association
Swedish Dental Society

United Kingdom

 General Dental Council - Regulatory Body
 NHS - Public Healthcare Dentistry
 British Dental Association
 Oral Health Foundation 
 British Orthodontic Society 
 Dental Professionals Association 
 The Faculty of General Dental Practice (UK)
 Orthodontic Technicians Association

United States
 American Dental Association

References

 
Organizations
Lists by country
Lists of medical and health organizations
Lists of professional associations